Itkonen is a Finnish surname. Notable people with the surname include:

 Ensio Itkonen (1926–2010), Finnish driving instructor and traffic educator
 Rieti Itkonen (1889–1951), Finnish lawyer, journalist, and politician
 T. I. Itkonen (1891–1968), Finnish historian and linguist

Finnish-language surnames